Aşağı Zeyid (also, Aşağı Zeyd, Ashaga Zeid, Ashaga-Zeyd, Ashagy Zeid, and Ash-Zeid) is a village and municipality in the Khachmaz Rayon of Azerbaijan.  It has a population of 908.

References 

Populated places in Khachmaz District